Bitez is a town in Bodrum district of the Muğla Province.

Geography
It is a coastal town and a popular summer resort. The settled population of Bitez is 8155  as of 2011. But during the summer months the population is much higher.

Economy
The climate in Bitez is suitable for all Mediterranean agricultural crops like olive, citrus, tobacco, etc. In the past fishing was also a part of the town economy. But at the present, the main economic activity is tourism. There are many hotels and restaurants in addition to blue flag beaches in Bitez which are mainly active during summers.

Bitez in popular culture

Bitez is famous for a popular song named Çökertme composed in the early years of the 20th century. There are two versions of the event upon which the lyrics refer to. But in both versions, the main theme is the struggle against Regie Company founded for Ottoman Public Debt Administration which controlled the tobacco trade in Turkey. The producers had no right to sell their own products. This gave rise to smuggler traffic and the smugglers began smuggling tobacco to Cos island of Greece (the distance to Cos island is only ). According to lyrics, Bodrum governor (so called Circassian governor, Çerkez kaymakam)  arrested two smugglers named Halil Efe and İpram Efe in Bitez shore and then executed them without trial. In another version of the story Halil Efe and his sweetheart were trying to escape to Cos island when they were arrested. The governor  was furious because he had an eye on Halil’s sweetheart Çakır Gülsüm (Güssüm)

References

Populated places in Muğla Province
Mediterranean Region, Turkey
Towns in Turkey
Bodrum District
Populated coastal places in Turkey
Articles containing video clips